Orlo K. Steele (born 28 October 1932) is a retired major general in the United States Marine Corps whose assignments included Inspector General of the Marine Force and Commander of the 2nd Marine Division. He graduated from Stanford University in 1956.

References

1932 births
Living people
United States Marine Corps generals